Edward Janeway may refer to:

 Edward G. Janeway (1901–1986), Vermont politician
 Edward Gamaliel Janeway (1841–1911), American physician